The women's 3000 metres event  at the 1996 European Athletics Indoor Championships was held in Stockholm Globe Arena on 8–9 March.

Medalists

Results

Heats
First 3 from each heat (Q) and the next 5 fastest (q) qualified for the final.

Final

References

3000 metres at the European Athletics Indoor Championships
3000
1996 in women's athletics